White cheese may refer to:
Asiago cheese, an Italian cow's milk cheese
Beyaz peynir, a salty, white cheese made from unpasteurized sheep (or cow) milk
Caș, a type of semi-soft white fresh cheese made from sheep or cow milk, produced in Romania
Domiati, a soft white salty cheese made primarily in Egypt and some Middle Eastern countries
Feta, a brined curd cheese traditionally made in Greece
Fromage blanc, a fresh cheese from France and Belgium
Kesong puti, a Filipino soft, white cheese, similar to queso blanco
Manouri, a Greek semi-soft, fresh white whey cheese made from goat and/or sheep milk whey left over from the production of cheese
Mascarpone, an Italian cheese made from cream, coagulated by the addition of citric acid or acetic acid
Mizithra, a Greek traditional, unpasteurized fresh cheese made with milk and whey from sheep and/or goats
Mozzarella, a fresh cheese, originally from southern Italy
Quark (dairy product), a type of fresh cheese
Minas cheese, a Brazilian cheese, usually fresh
Queso blanco, a creamy, soft, and mild unaged white cheese
Ricotta, an Italian whey cheese
Sirene, a type of brine cheese made in Southeastern Europe